Suryakant Lonkar is an Indian politician and member of the Shiv Sena. Lonkar is a one term member of the Maharashtra Legislative Assembly in 1995 from the  Pune Cantonment constituency assembly constituency in Pune.

References 

Politicians from Pune
Shiv Sena politicians
Members of the Maharashtra Legislative Assembly
Living people
Marathi politicians
Year of birth missing (living people)